Meloë was a town in ancient Isauria. Meloë is a titular see of the Roman Catholic Church.

Its site is tentatively located near Malya in Asiatic Turkey.

References

Populated places in ancient Isauria
Catholic titular sees in Asia
Ancient Greek archaeological sites in Turkey
Former populated places in Turkey